The 1997 Senior League World Series took place from August 10–16 in Kissimmee, Florida, United States. San Francisco, Venezuela defeated Yucaipa, California in the championship game. It was Venezuela's second straight championship.

Teams

Results

Winner's Bracket

Loser's Bracket

Placement Bracket

Elimination Round

References

Senior League World Series
Senior League World Series
1997 in sports in Florida